Notocolpodes is a genus of ground beetles in the family Carabidae. There are more than 30 described species in Notocolpodes, found in Madagascar.

Species
These 33 species belong to the genus Notocolpodes:

 Notocolpodes aeneolus (Jeannel, 1948)
 Notocolpodes ambatovositrae Basilewsky, 1985
 Notocolpodes ankaratrae Basilewsky, 1985
 Notocolpodes commistus Basilewsky, 1985
 Notocolpodes cribellatus Basilewsky, 1985
 Notocolpodes euleptus (Alluaud, 1909)
 Notocolpodes gallienii (Alluaud, 1909)
 Notocolpodes hylonomus (Alluaud, 1935)
 Notocolpodes jeanneli (Basilewsky, 1970)
 Notocolpodes lampros Basilewsky, 1985
 Notocolpodes lapidicola Basilewsky, 1985
 Notocolpodes lautus (Basilewsky, 1970)
 Notocolpodes lenis (Jeannel, 1955)
 Notocolpodes mananarae Basilewsky, 1985
 Notocolpodes marojejyanus Basilewsky, 1985
 Notocolpodes metallicus Basilewsky, 1985
 Notocolpodes micracis (Jeannel, 1948)
 Notocolpodes midongyanus Basilewsky, 1985
 Notocolpodes morpho (Jeannel, 1948)
 Notocolpodes nigrita (Jeannel, 1955)
 Notocolpodes obtusidens (Alluaud, 1897)
 Notocolpodes olsoufieffi (Alluaud, 1935)
 Notocolpodes onivensis (Alluaud, 1935)
 Notocolpodes ovalipennis (Jeannel, 1948)
 Notocolpodes perturbatus Basilewsky, 1985
 Notocolpodes punctatostriatus (Basilewsky, 1970)
 Notocolpodes rufobrunneus (Basilewsky, 1970)
 Notocolpodes rugicollis (Jeannel, 1948)
 Notocolpodes sericeus (Jeannel, 1948)
 Notocolpodes sogai (Basilewsky, 1970)
 Notocolpodes suavis (Alluaud, 1899)
 Notocolpodes subpolitus (Alluaud, 1932)
 Notocolpodes vicinus Basilewsky, 1985

References

Platyninae